Baiōken Eishun (active ) was a Japanese painter and print artist of the Kaigetsudō school of ukiyo-e art. He is also alternatively known as Hasegawa Eishun , Baiōken Nagaharu, Takeda Harunobu and a number of other art-names. He produced both hanging scroll full-color paintings typical of the Kaigetsudō style and mode, and a number of designs for illustrations for woodblock printed books.

Richard Lane describes Eishun's work as very similar to that of Matsuno Chikanobu, though the courtesans in his bijinga (paintings of beauties) are somewhat taller, slimmer, and more serious-looking. Eishun, along with Chikanobu, represents something of a revival of the Kaigetsudō school which fell into decline in the preceding decades following the exile of its founder, Kaigetsudō Ando, in 1714.

Notes

References
 Lane, Richard. (1978).  Images from the Floating World, The Japanese Print. Oxford: Oxford University Press. ;  OCLC 5246796
 Nussbaum, Louis Frédéric and Käthe Roth. (2005). "Baiōken Nagaharu," Japan Encyclopedia. Cambridge: Harvard University Press. ; OCLC 48943301

Eishun